Atzmus/atzmut ( from the Hebrew  etzem) is the descriptive term referred to in Kabbalah, and explored in Hasidic thought, for the divine essence.

Classical Kabbalah predominantly refers to the Godhead in Judaism with its designated term "Ein Sof" ("No end"-Infinite), as this distinguishes between the divine being beyond description and manifestation, and divine emanations within creation, which become the descriptive concern of systemised Kabbalistic categorisation. Reference to atzmus is usually restricted in Kabbalistic theory to discussion whether "Ein Sof" represents the ultimate divine being in itself, or to God as first cause of creation.

Hasidic thought however, concerns itself with relating transcendent esoteric Kabbalah to the internalised psychological experience of man. In Hasidism, the essential divine atzmus above emanation is related to its description of omnipresent divine panentheism in the physical World, and focus on the essential divinity in daily Jewish spiritual experience. This underlies Hasidism's adjustment of Jewish values to extol the innate sincerity of the common folk, and to shape its concern with selfless spiritual motivation in learning, prayer and benevolence, beyond traditional Talmudic mastery for its own sake alone. The concealed divine soul essence that each person possesses becomes revealed in the Hasidic doctrine of the Tzadik leader as divine channel of physical and spiritual sustenance for the community, while the elite perception of essential divine unity of creation in ideal contemplation by the capable few, realises the union of the soul in God. In the Habad investigation of Hasidic thought, atzmus relates, beyond the revelations of Kabbalah, to the essential divine unity and purpose of creation, revealed in the eschatological future as the ultimate Dirah Betachtonim (divine "dwelling place in the lowest physical realm), through the essential will in Mitzvot Jewish observances. This relates to the divine essence of Torah and the soul, both reflecting the essential fifth level of Yechidah ("Singular"). While esoteric Kabbalah relates to the transcendent fourth level of Torah interpretation and the soul, the level of Chayah (Chochmah-Wisdom insight), the nature of Yechidah (innermost Keter-Will delight), enables its higher divine source to permeate and descend lower into perception, as essence permeates all while remaining distinct. The essence of the divine is not restricted to Ein Sof limitlessness or to transcendent Kabbalistic emanation alone. Through seeking to reveal the divine closeness and Omnipresence to all the community, religiously learned or illiterate, Hasidism, across its different schools, sought to hasten the ultimate Messianic realisation of atzmus unity.

Background

Perceptions of God in Jewish philosophy and Kabbalah 

Medieval Jewish philosophers like Maimonides, articulate a transcendent negative theology where it is only possible to describe God in terms of what He is not. Here Divine Unity means that God's singularity is unique and bears no relation to any concept one can conceive. Kabbalah, influenced by the philosophical argument, but seeking the Biblical God who is also immanent, gives a different, more radical solution. It distinguishes between God in Himself and in His emanations. The Infinite Divine, the Ein Sof ("Limitless") is beyond all understanding, description or manifestation. Only through the 10 Sephirot Divine attributes is God revealed to Creation, and the sustaining lifeforce that continuously recreates existence is channeled. The final sephirah Malchut (Kingship) becomes the feminine Shechina (Divine presence), the immanent indwelling Divinity in Creation. In manifestation God is anthropomorphically described as both male and female, where male denotes outward giving and female denotes inward nurturing.

In Kabbalah there are traces of Panentheism, such as the Zohar's description of the two forms of sustenance, the "Light that surrounds" and the "Light that fills" all Worlds, and Moshe Cordovero's description of Panentheism in his 16th-century quasi-rational hierarchical systemisation of Kabbalah. Cordovero reconciles previous opinions regarding the Divine nature of the sephirot, by describing them as lights invested in vessels. Only the vessels differentiate, while the light, originating from the Ein Sof, is undifferentiated, removing any notion of plurality, in the manner water pours into different coloured vessels or light streams through different colours of glass. Regarding perception of Divinity, influenced by the negative theology of the philosophers, Cordovero says:
Whenever one forms a conceptual image of God, he should immediately backtrack, recoiling from the false notion, as any notion is shaped by man's spatial world. Rather, he should "Run and Return" towards imagining Divinity, and then rejecting it.
In Lurianic Kabbalah the first act of Creation is the primordial Tzimtzum (self "Withdrawal") of God, to resolve the problem of how finite Creation could emerge from the Infinite. Beforehand, the Ohr Ein Sof fills all reality, nullifying potential creation into non-existence. The tzimtzum constitutes a radical leap, withdrawing the infinite light into God, to allow the latent potentially finite light to emerge, from which Creation unfolds. Subsequently, the sephirot reconfigure as Partzufim, recasting Cordovero's linear hierarchy with one of enclothement, allowing lower Creation to conceal within it higher Divine origins.

Opinions in Kabbalah about the Ein Sof and Atzmus 

Before Moshe Cordovero and Isaac Luria gave subsequent systemisations of Kabbalah in the 16th century, Medieval Kabbalists debated the relationship between the Divine Will Keter and the Ein Sof. This involved the philosophical need to divorce the sephirot from any notions of plurality in God, and involved the question of whether the Ein Sof describes the essential Divine Being, or God as first cause of Creation. Cordovero lists Keter as the first sephirah, part of Creation. Luria takes an intermediate view that the Ein Sof does not represent the essence of God, nor that Keter is listed as the first sephirah within Creation, but instead the Ein Sof sublimely transcends Keter, mediating between Atzmus and Keter. He agrees with Cordovero's inclusion of Keter in the sephirot if one is describing the lights in the Sephirot, but in unqualified reference begins the sephirot from Chochmah (Wisdom), as this lists the vessels of the sephirot in Creation.

Ten stages of God’s Infinite Light before the beginning of Creation 
Chabad Kabbalist Yitzchak Ginsburgh describes 10 unfolding stages in the revelation of the Ohr Ein Sof (Light of the Infinite Ein Sof), based on Kabbalah and Chabad thought:

1 Atzmut (God's Absolute Essence)
2 Yachid (The Single One)
3 Echad (The One)
4 Sha’ashuim Atzmi’im (The Delights of Self)
5 Aliyat Haratzon (The “ascent” of God's will to create the world)
6 Ana Emloch (The Primordial “Thought” of “I Shall Rule”; God's Primordial Will to be “King”)
7 Ein Sof (Infinity)
8 Kadmon (The Primordial One)
9 Avir Kadmon (Primordial Atmosphere)
10 Adam Kadma’ah Stima’ah (Concealed Primordial Man)

Atzmus in Hasidism

Hasidic Panentheism 

The Baal Shem Tov (1698–1760), founder of Hasidic Judaism, gave a new stage to Jewish mysticism, by relating the transcendent, esoteric structures of Kabbalah to inner psychological perception and correspondence within the experience of man. This brought Kabbalah into tangible daily life, while elevating man through the perception of Divinity within himself. The central focus of this was the Divine immanence in all Creation, experienced by both common folk and scholars in joy and cleaving to God amidst materiality.

In Hasidic philosophy is also a higher, elite perception of the Panentheistic nullification of Creation within the Omnipresent Divine Unity. "All is God, and God is All". The ideal mystical perception during moments of prayer is Bittul ("Nullification"/annihilation of ego) in the Divine reality, beyond the emotional fervour of Divine immanence. In a renowned parable of the Baal Shem Tov:
...To understand this, we must turn to the Zohar (eg. II 146b), which says that the gates of the heikhalot (Heavenly palaces/chambers) of prayer are one above the other, and the angels receive the prayers and transfer them upward to the Throne of Glory... Now this must be understood: do we not know of God, blessed be His Name, that "the whole earth is full of His glory" (Isaiah 6:3), and that :there is no place empty of Him"? (Tikkunei Zohar 57) If so, then His blessed glory is found wherever anyone prays. In that case, why is it necessary for our prayers to be received by angels who go and transmit them from heikhal to heikhal? It seems to me that the answer follows upon...a parable that my teacher, the Besht, once told before the sounding of the shofar on Rosh Hashanah:
There was once a great and wise king who magically created the illusion of walls and towers and gates. He commanded his people to come to him by way of these gates and towers, and had treasures from the royal treasury displayed at every gate. There were some who went as far as the first gate and then returned, laden with treasure. Others proceeded to gates deeper within the palace and closer to the king; but none reached the king himself. At last, the king's son made a great effort to go to his father, the king. Then he saw that there was really no barrier separating him from his father, for it was all an illusion.
...I heard from my teacher (the Besht) of blessed memory on the verse "all the workers of iniquity shall be scattered" (Psalms 92:10): by means of man's knowledge that "the whole earth is full of His glory", and that every motion and thought, everything, comes from Him - by this very knowledge are all the workers of iniquity scattered. hence, all the angels and the heikhalot were created and made, as it were, from his essence, like the snail whose shell is formed of itself. So, by means of this knowledge, there is no longer any barrier or sundering curtain between man and God.
As this ideal was not within the reach of everyone, mainstream Hasidism instituted the social mysticism of the Tzadik Rebbe Divine intermediary, who could inspire the followers during pilgrimage to their court, and channel Divine spiritual and physical blessing to them. Through attachment to the Tzadik, they could transcend their limited physical perceptions through emotional faith.

The Divine soul in Hasidism 

In the Tanya (1797), a classic early work of Hasidic thought, Shneur Zalman of Liadi gave Hasidic doctrine a metaphysical and psychological systemisation. He builds divine service around the conflict between the Divine soul and the natural soul, stating that deeply concealed within the unconscious of each soul of Israel is "an actual part of God above (Atzmus), literally". This notion underscores general Kabbalah and Hasidism, but is read in a literalist way in the Tanya. Modernist critical Neo-Hasidism has read this statement in existentialist, rather than literalist terms, applicable equally to Jews and non-Jews.

Hasidic investigation of Atzmus 

The school of Habad, founded by Schneur Zalman of Liadi (1745–1812), differed from mainstream Hasidism in seeking to intellectually articulate Hasidic thought in systematic study, with the mind as the route to the heart. Consequently, it retained the mystical ideal to communicate as widely as possible the elite nullification of Creation in Divine Unity. In the second section of the Tanya, Schneur Zalman philosophically presents the Panentheism of the Baal Shem Tov, drawing in previous Kabbalistic description. Two levels of Divine Unity are described, both paradoxically true; Lower Unity of emanated Creation dependent on God, Higher Unity of illusionary Creation nullified within God. The follower of Habad method contemplates (Hisbonenus) at length the paradoxical ascent to God during private prayer, or learns Habad thought before communal prayer. The second leader of Habad, Dovber Schneuri expands the thought of his father into practical understanding. His "Tract on Ecstasy" instructs the intellectual contemplation to reach the consummate complete Bittul of no self-awareness. Superficial emotional "Enthusiasm" is to be rejected, as it involves the ego. At the supreme level, Divine Atzmus is encountered through the follower perceiving the Divine Etzem essence of his soul. After the Tract on Ecstasy, Dovber withdrew it from general circulation, instead outlining a lower contemplative instruction, accessible to all, in the "Gate of Unity". It is necessary for the follower to know their spiritual ability. For the average follower, to aim for self-unaware Bittul, beyond emotion, would instead lead to falling below the beneficial spiritual inspiration of emotions. Today, normative ideal Habad practice is to study Hasidic philosophy before prayer, including amongst many texts those on Divine Panentheism, while using the emotional love and awe of God generated, in the subsequent communal morning service. Comsumate Bittul remains for select elite, though all who study Habad thought gain some intellectual and emotional appreciation of the complete Divine Unity.

Dirah BeTachtonim and the purpose of Creation

Atzmus and Mitzvot Jewish observances

Divinity prior to Tzimtum in Hasidic thought

Hasidism and the level of Yechidah

See also 
Background:
God in Judaism
Godhead (Judaism)
Ein Sof
Ayin and Yesh
Four Worlds
Pardes (Jewish exegesis)
Hasidism:
Hasidic thought
Divine Providence and Unity in Hasidism
Kochos hanefesh
Deveikut
Generational ascent in Kabbalah

References

Further reading
On the Essence of Chasidus, part of Bilingual English-Hebrew Chasidic Heritage Series, Menachem Mendel Schneerson, Kehot pub. Philosophical presentation of the essential nature of Hasidic thought and its relation to other aspects of Torah
Heaven On Earth: Reflections on the Theology of Rabbi Menachem M. Schneerson, the Lubavitcher Rebbe, Faitel Levin, Kehot pub. Comparison of the 7th Rebbe's Atzmus-Dirah BeTachtonim theology with the preceding 6 generations of Habad Hasidic thought
Anticipating the Redemption: Maamarim of the Lubavitcher Rebbe Rabbi Menachem M. Schneerson Concerning the Era of Redemption Vol 1 and 2, translated into English, Kehot pub. Hasidic investigations of the eschatological future, ascending through Kabbalistic manifestations to ultimate Divine Atzmus
Holiday Maamarim", translated by Rabbi David Rothschild, distributed by the Kehot Publication Society, 2008, . Two-volume set of 24 Maamarim by the Lubavitcher Rebbes on the holidays. Literally exposition by the masters of chabad thought on Atzmus, Ein Sof and everything that follows.

External links
A Home for G-d, collection of articles on Dirah Betachtonim'' at Chabad.org
What We Believe, online book chapters on the fundamental principles of Jewish faith from the view of Hasidic thought
An essay on God's simple unity
The Mittler Rebbe's Shar HaYichud
Atzmus and the Divine stages before the beginning of Creation, explored in Habad systemisation of Hasidic thought, from inner.org
Emunah-Highest Soul Power and Atzmus from inner.org
The development of Kabbalistic systemisation in three stages, Hasidism-Omnipresence, at inner.org
Five stages in the development of Kabbalah, Hasidism-Yechidah, at inner.org

Hasidic thought
Jewish theology
Kabbalistic words and phrases